Merari Siregar (13 July 1896 Sipirok, North Sumatra   - 23 April 1941, Kalianget, Madura, East Java) was an Indonesian writer and also the author of the first novel written in Indonesian.
 
He completed his studies at a Kweekschool and in 1923 received a diploma as Handelscorrespondent Bond 'Federal Trade Correspondent' in Jakarta. He taught in Medan, North Sumatra, and then worked in a public hospital in Jakarta, after that he started to move again, this time to Madura. He wrote Si Jamin dan Si Johan ('The History of Jamin and Johan') which was an adaptation of Jan Smees by the Dutch author Justus Van Maurik. In Cerita tentang Busuk dan Wanginya Kota Betawi, he wrote about the "rot" and "perfume" of Batavia. He is especially known for Azab dan Sengsara ('Pain and Suffering') from 1920 about the problems of a forced marriage.

Works

Novels
 Azab dan Sengsara
 Si Jamin dan Si Johan
 Azab dan Sengsara. 1920.
 Binasa Karena Gadis Priangan. 1931.
 Cerita tentang Busuk dan Wanginya Kota Betawi. 1924.
 Cinta dan Hawa.

Other
Si Jamin dan si Johan. Jakarta: Balai Pustaka 1918.

References

1896 births
1941 deaths
People from South Tapanuli Regency
People of Batak descent
Indonesian male novelists
Indonesian male writers
20th-century novelists
20th-century male writers